Łukasz Gikiewicz (born 26 October 1987) is a Polish professional footballer who plays as a striker.

Career

Club
Born in Olsztyn, Gikiewicz is youth exponent of Warmia Olsztyn. In March 2009, he moved to Polonia Bytom on 2.5-year contract from Unia Janikowo. In August 2009, he moved to ŁKS Łódź on a one-year deal. In the summer 2010, he joined Śląsk Wrocław on a four-year contract deal. On 27 June 2013, he signed a contract with Omonia from Cyprus.

In March 2014, Gikiewicz signed for Kazakhstan Premier League side FC Tobol.

After spells at Cypriot football clubs Omonia and AEL Limassol Gikiewicz signed a 1.5-year deal with Levski Sofia in February. On 27 February 2015, he scored on his official A PFG debut, an 8–0 home rout against Haskovo. In April 2015 he was frozen out of the first team after a conflict with manager Stoycho Stoev.

On 5 August 2019, Lukasz Gikiewicz made his debut for Romanian side FCSB in a 1–2 loss away from home against Astra.

On 21 August 2021, Gikiewicz joined Indian Super League side Chennaiyin on a one-year deal.

Personal life
Łukasz Gikiewicz's twin brother Rafał Gikiewicz is also a footballer who plays as a goalkeeper.

Career statistics

Club
Statistics accurate as of match played 18 August 2019.

Honours

Club

Śląsk Wrocław
 Ekstraklasa: 2011–12
 Polish Super Cup: 2012

Al-Faisaly
 Jordan Premier League: 2016–17
 VIRUDHUNAGAR LEAGUE: 2016–17
 Jordan Super Cup: 2017, 2020

Individual
 Jordan Premier League top scorer: 2017–18 (14 goals)

References

External links
 
 Profile at LevskiSofia.info

1987 births
Living people
Sportspeople from Olsztyn
Polish footballers
Association football forwards
Olimpia Elbląg players
Wigry Suwałki players
Unia Janikowo players
Polonia Bytom players
ŁKS Łódź players
Śląsk Wrocław players
AC Omonia players
FC Tobol players
AEL Limassol players
PFC Levski Sofia players
Al-Wehda Club (Mecca) players
Łukasz Gikiewicz
Łukasz Gikiewicz
Al-Faisaly SC players
Hajer FC players
FC Steaua București players
East Riffa Club players
Chennaiyin FC players
I liga players
Ekstraklasa players
Cypriot First Division players
Kazakhstan Premier League players
First Professional Football League (Bulgaria) players
Saudi First Division League players
Saudi Professional League players
Łukasz Gikiewicz
Jordanian Pro League players
Liga I players
Bahraini Premier League players
Indian Super League players
Polish expatriate footballers
Expatriate footballers in Cyprus
Expatriate footballers in Kazakhstan
Expatriate footballers in Bulgaria
Expatriate footballers in Saudi Arabia
Expatriate footballers in Thailand
Expatriate footballers in Jordan
Expatriate footballers in Romania
Expatriate footballers in Bahrain
Expatriate footballers in India
Polish expatriate sportspeople in Cyprus
Polish expatriate sportspeople in Kazakhstan
Polish expatriate sportspeople in Bulgaria
Polish expatriate sportspeople in Saudi Arabia
Polish expatriate sportspeople in Thailand
Polish expatriate sportspeople in Jordan
Polish expatriate sportspeople in Romania
Polish expatriate sportspeople in Bahrain
Polish expatriate sportspeople in India